is a Japanese politician and a former mayor of Kitakyushu, Japan. A graduate of the University of Tokyo, he was elected to the House of Representatives in Diet of Japan (parliament) for the first time in 1986 as a member of Democratic Socialist Party, which later became part of Democratic Party of Japan. After losing his seat in 1990, he was re-elected in 1993. In February 2007 he was elected mayor of Kitakyushu and went on to serve four terms, until 2023.

References

External links 
  

1953 births
Living people
People from Nishinomiya
University of Tokyo alumni
Members of the House of Representatives (Japan)
Mayors of places in Japan
Democratic Party of Japan politicians
Democratic Socialist Party (Japan) politicians
21st-century Japanese politicians